John Morris (19 February 1810 – 7 January 1886) was an English geologist.

Life
He was born in 1810 at Homerton, London, and educated at private schools. 
He was engaged for some years as a pharmaceutical chemist at Kensington, but soon became interested in geology and other branches of science, and ultimately retired from business. 
His published papers speedily attracted notice, and his Catalogue of British Fossils, published in 1845, a work involving much critical research, added greatly to his reputation.

Morris was professor of geology at University College, London from 1854 to 1877. He was elected F.G.S. in 1845. Along with Bowerbank and five others, he was a founding member of the London Clay Club. Morris was president of the Geologists' Association from 1868 to 1871 and from 1877 to 1879. He was awarded the Lyell Medal in 1876. Morris's best original work was done on Eocene and Jurassic rocks. His Catalogue of British Fossils was an important pioneering effort in palaeontology.

He died on 7 January 1886, and was buried at Kensal Green. One daughter survived him.

References

External links
A Short Biography of John Morris – from University College London
Morris, John (1810–1886) – Biodiversity Heritage Library

1810 births
1886 deaths
English palaeontologists
Fellows of the Royal Geographical Society
Lyell Medal winners
Academics of University College London
Burials at Kensal Green Cemetery
Scientists from London
Presidents of the Geologists' Association